Siauw Giok Tjhan (March 23, 1914 – November 20, 1981) was a Chinese Indonesian activist and politician. Born in Kapasan, Surabaya, East Java, Indonesia, he was a cabinet minister under Indonesia president Sukarno and was imprisoned for 12 years by the subsequent president, Suharto. He was active in rights campaigning and was part of Baperki, including as the group's leader. He supported the Communist takeover of China, opposed to Taiwan, and was a Marxist.

References

1914 births
1981 deaths
Indonesian activists
Indonesian people of Chinese descent
Indonesian Marxists
Members of the People's Representative Council, 1950
Members of the People's Representative Council, 1955
Indonesian political prisoners